The 1925 Syracuse Orangemen football team was an American football team that represented Syracuse University as an independent during the 1925 college football season. In its first season under head coach Pete Reynolds, the team compiled an 8–1–1 record, shut out seven of ten opponents, and outscored all opponents by a total of 202 to 27.

Schedule

References

Syracuse
Syracuse Orange football seasons
Syracuse Orangemen football